Sabahat Rasheed (born 11 December 1982) is a Pakistani former cricketer who played as a right-arm off break bowler. She appeared in 13 One Day Internationals for Pakistan between 2005 and 2007. She played domestic cricket for Lahore, Khyber Pakhtunkhwa, Balochistan and Saif Sports Saga.

Sabahat made her ODI debut in the 2005–06 Women's Asia Cup which was held in Pakistan. She also represented the national women's cricket team in the 2006 Women's Asia Cup. Sabahat Rasheed was also the member of the  Pakistan team which emerged as runners-up to South Africa in the 2008 Women's Cricket World Cup Qualifier.

References

External links 
 
 

1982 births
Living people
Cricketers from Lahore
Pakistani women cricketers
Pakistan women One Day International cricketers
Lahore women cricketers
Khyber Pakhtunkhwa women cricketers
Baluchistan women cricketers
Saif Sports Saga women cricketers